Modellist-ID is the first exclusive online network platform for international fashion models worldwide.
It offers a safe online community and several convenient services and deals to the models. In various ways they can connect to each other and share both practical information and fun tips on various types of places to go. The website also offers a public platform to the models to a rapidly growing audience. On modellist-id.com, blogs, photos and videos can be uploaded about their lives, experiences and favorite products.

The site is founded by a group of international fashion models. International fashion model Celine Prins came up with the idea and partly founded it. It was further developed with Valerie van Lanschot and many other model contributors. 
As of today many international top models have joined and contribute to the site.

References

Fashion websites
Dutch social networking websites